Biljana Rubaković (born 1960) is a Serbian politician. She briefly served in the National Assembly of Serbia in 2016 as a member of the right-wing Dveri party.

Private career
Rubaković is a professor from Čačak.

Politician

Parliamentarian
Rubaković received the thirty-sixth position on Dveri's electoral list in the 2014 Serbian parliamentary election. During the campaign, she and other female Dveri candidates offered a view of women's rights based around traditional gender roles. The list did not cross the electoral threshold to win representation in the assembly.

She received the fifth position on a combined Dveri–Democratic Party of Serbia (Demokratska stranka Srbije, DSS) list in the 2016 parliamentary election and was elected when the list won thirteen mandates. The Serbian Progressive Party (Srpska napredna stranka, SNS) and its allies won a majority victory, and Rubaković served in opposition.

Her departure from the national assembly was abrupt. On 21 June 2016, Dveri announced that Rubaković would serve as a member of the assembly's health and family committee and the committee for spatial planning, transport, infrastructure, and telecommunications. The following day, she resigned from the assembly. Her reasons for this decision do not appear to have been made public.

Municipal politics
Rubaković appeared in the sixth position on Dveri's list for the Čačak city assembly in the 2012 Serbian local elections and was elected when the list won thirteen out of seventy-five mandates. She was promoted to the third position on the list for the 2016 local elections and was re-elected when the list won twenty-one seats, finishing second against the Progressive Party. In 2017, she and other Dveri representatives were cited for disorderly behaviour in the assembly.

Dveri boycotted the 2020 elections at the republic and local levels, and she was not a candidate in the 2020 local elections.

After 2020
Dveri contested the 2022 Serbian parliamentary election in an alliance with Žika Gojković's branch of the Movement for the Restoration of the Kingdom of Serbia (Pokret obnove Kraljevine Srbije, POKS). Rubaković received the thirty-fifth position on their combined list and missed re-election when the list won ten mandates.

References

Living people
1960 births
Politicians from Čačak
21st-century Serbian women politicians
21st-century Serbian politicians
Members of the National Assembly (Serbia)
Dveri politicians
Women members of the National Assembly (Serbia)